Punicalagin is an ellagitannin, a type of phenolic compound. It is found as alpha and beta isomers in pomegranates (Punica granatum), Terminalia catappa, Terminalia myriocarpa, and in Combretum molle, the velvet bushwillow, a plant species found in South Africa. These three genera are all Myrtales and the last two are both Combretaceae.

Research 
Punicalagins are water-soluble and hydrolyze into smaller phenolic compounds, such as ellagic acid. There were no toxic effects in rats on a 6% diet of punicalagins for 37 days. In laboratory research, punicalagins had carbonic anhydrase inhibitor activity.

References 

Pomegranate ellagitannins
Carbonic anhydrase inhibitors